The Lebanese Second Division is the second division of Lebanese football. It is controlled by the Lebanese Football Association. The top two teams qualify for the Lebanese Premier League and replace the relegated teams, while the bottom two are relegated to the Lebanese Third Division.

League table

References

Lebanese Second Division seasons
Leb
2010–11 in Lebanese football